The Haunted is a 2019 Philippine horror drama television series starring Jake Cuenca, Shaina Magdayao, Denise Laurel, and Queenzy Calma. The series premiered on ABS-CBN's Yes Weekend! Sunday block and worldwide via The Filipino Channel from December 8, 2019 to February 9, 2020, replacing Parasite Island.

Series overview

Episodes

Season 1

References

Lists of Philippine drama television series episodes